Sainte-Julienne Aerodrome  was located  south of Sainte-Julienne, Quebec, Canada.

References

Defunct airports in Quebec